Slade Callaghan (born August 21, 1970 in Bridgetown, Barbados) is a jockey in Thoroughbred horse racing.

Considered tall for a jockey at 5' 8", Callaghan competed in his native Barbados where his success led him to relocate in 1994 to a base at Woodbine Racetrack in Toronto, Ontario, Canada.

Among his victories, Callaghan captured the 2002 Breeders' Stakes, a Canadian Classic Race. In 2004 he traveled to his homeland where he won the country's most prestigious race, the Barbados Gold Cup.

Year-end charts

References
 Profile of Slade Callaghan at Woodbine Media Guide

1970 births
Living people
Barbadian emigrants to Canada
Barbadian jockeys
Canadian jockeys
Sportspeople from Bridgetown